Salah Abdel-Shafi ( born 1962 in Gaza City) is a Palestinian economist, and the  Palestinian ambassador to Austria and permanent observer to the United Nations in Vienna, holding the position since September 2013. From 2010 to 2013 he served as the Palestinian ambassador to Germany, he was the first Palestinian representative to Germany to officially hold ambassadorial status. From 2006 to 2010 he was the Palestinian ambassador to Sweden. Formerly General Director of the Gaza Community Mental Health Program, a consultant, and adviser to the World Bank. His father was the Palestinian political and community leader Haidar Abdel-Shafi.

References

Living people
1962 births
Palestinian economists
Ambassadors of the State of Palestine to Austria
Ambassadors of the State of Palestine to Germany
Ambassadors of the State of Palestine to Sweden